The 2021–22 Bobsleigh World Cup was a multi-race series over a season for bobsleigh. The season started in Innsbruck-Igls, Austria on 20 November 2021 and finished in St. Moritz, Switzerland on 16 January 2022. The season sponsor was BMW.

Calendar 
Below is the schedule of the 2021/22 season.

Bobsleigh World Cup

Women's Monobob World Series 

(*) - additional races

Results

Two-man

Four-man

Women’s Monobob World Series 

(*) - additional races

Two-woman

Standings

Two-man

Four-man

Women’s Monobob World Series 
Only best five results of each pilot were added up.

(*) - additional races

Two-woman

Medal table

Points

References 

Bobsleigh World Cup
2021 in bobsleigh
2022 in bobsleigh